Marián Vajda (born 24 March 1965) is a Slovak professional tennis coach and former player. He is the former head coach of Novak Djokovic, coaching Djokovic almost his entire professional career, winning 85 titles together (out of the 93 won by Djokovic). Vajda is the most successful coach in the history of tennis in terms of Grand Slam titles winning 20 Grand Slam trophies with Novak Djokovic (out of the 22 won by Djokovic).

Career
Vajda was born in Považská Bystrica. He was a member of the Olympic Team of Czechoslovakia, and in 1992 he competed in the Olympic Games of Barcelona, being eliminated in the first round by Gilad Bloom. He reached the third round of the 1991 French Open, won two singles titles and achieved a career-high singles ranking of World No. 34 in September 1987. Vajda is a former captain of the Slovakia Davis Cup and Fed Cup teams. Vajda was the coach of Karol Kučera from 2001 to 2005.

Vajda has been the coach of Novak Djokovic from 2006 until 2017, then again from 2018 to 2022. From December 2013 until 2016, Boris Becker was Djokovic's head coach with Vajda remaining part of Djokovic's team. For his achievements with the Serbian tennis player, Vajda won the award for best coach by the Olympic Committee of Serbia in both 2010 and 2011. In 2018, Vajda won the ATP Coach of the Year award.

Vajda started coaching fellow Slovak Alex Molčan in May 2022.

Career finals

Singles (2 titles, 2 runners-up)

References

External links
 
 
 
 
 
 

1965 births
Living people
Novak Djokovic coaches
Czechoslovak male tennis players
Olympic tennis players of Czechoslovakia
Sportspeople from Považská Bystrica
Slovak male tennis players
Slovak tennis coaches
Tennis players at the 1992 Summer Olympics
Competitors at the 1986 Goodwill Games
Goodwill Games medalists in tennis
Friendship Games medalists in tennis